"Yummy" is the second single released by Puerto Rican singer Chelo. The song can be found on Chelo's debut album, 360°. The song was featured at the end of the video for "Cha Cha", Chelo's first single. In the full version of the video, Miss Universe 2006 winner Zuleyka Rivera was featured in a cameo. In the remix version it features American rapper Too Short. The song was not as successful as his first single, peaking at #48 on the Billboard Hot Latin Tracks chart.

References 

2005 songs
2006 singles
Chelo (American singer) songs
Too Short songs
Sony BMG Norte singles